Daniel Green (born May 29, 1955) is a Canadian politician, environmentalist and scientific communicator. Since 2000, he has been a consultant for Sierra Club of Canada, Société pour vaincre la pollution (SVP), Coalition Eau Secours, the Rivers Foundation, Nature Québec and Parks Canada.

In 2014, Elizabeth May appointed him deputy leader of the Green Party of Canada. He served as deputy leader alongside Jo-Ann Roberts until November 2019, when Roberts became the interim leader of the party.

Environmental science career 
A graduate in biological sciences and environmental science from the Université du Québec à Montréal, Green has been working on the problem of toxic substances in the environment since the 1980s. Between 1980 and 2000, he headed Société pour vaincre la pollution (SVP).

Since the early 2000s, Green has acted as the SVP's co-chair and has been vocal against the effect of pollution on public health. Examples of his activism are the asbestos controversy, the trichlorethylene contaminated water case in Shannon, the Lac-Mégantic rail disaster and Montreal REM train project.

Political career 
In 2014, Green became a member of the Green Party of Canada. In December 2014, Green Party leader Elizabeth May appointed him deputy leader of the party. He ran in the 2015 Canadian federal election in the new riding of Ville-Marie—Le Sud-Ouest—Île-des-Sœurs. He lost to Liberal candidate Marc Miller.

As part of the Liberal government's plan to reform Canada's electoral system following the 2015 election, Green pushed for the introduction of a proportional voting system, which, in his opinion, would make the electoral process more democratic and more representative. To this end, he sought to show the differences between first-past-the-post voting and proportional representation.

Green ran in a federal by-election in the riding of Saint-Laurent in March 2017, which happened due to former Liberal leader Stéphane Dion's resignation from the House of Commons. He came third behind Liberal candidate Emmanuella Lambropoulos and Conservative candidate Jimmy Yu, winning 8% of the vote. In February 2019, he came third in the federal by-election in Outremont, which happened due to former New Democratic Party leader Tom Mulcair's resignation, with 12.9% of the vote, the best result for the Green Party of Canada in Quebec elections.

Electoral record

References 

1955 births
Green Party of Canada candidates in the 2015 Canadian federal election
Green Party of Canada candidates in the 2019 Canadian federal election
Science communicators
Canadian activists
Living people